Thunderdell, also recorded as Thunderdel, Thunderel, Thundrel, Thunderdale, or Thunderbore, was a two-headed giant of Cornwall slain by Jack the Giant-Killer in the stories of Tabart and others.

Jeff Rovin's The Encyclopedia of Monsters (New York: Facts on File, 1989) misspells Thunderdell as "Thunderel", and after describing him, proceeds to tell the basic story of "Jack and the Beanstalk" with no further mention of "Thunderel", despite being the title of the entry. He then refers readers to Cormoran.

Appearance
In Jack the Giant Killer, Thunderdell first appeared where he crashed a banquet that was prepared for Jack. During this time, he chanted "fee fau fum." Jack defeats and beheads the two-headed giant with a trick involving the house's moat and drawbridge.

Popular culture
 Thunderdell is in the Monster in My Pocket where his number is #98.
 The Thunderdell name is used for a giant in Jack and the Beanstalk: The Real Story who was portrayed by Bill Barretta. This version is based on the giant from "Jack and the Beanstalk".

External links

 Gandolf.com

Arthurian characters
British folklore
English giants
Fictional giants
Jack the Giant Killer
Cornish folklore